The 1998–99 League of Ireland First Division season was the 14th season of the League of Ireland First Division.

Overview
The First Division was contested by 10 teams and Drogheda United F.C. won the division.

Final table

Promotion/relegation play-off
Third placed Cobh Ramblers F.C. played off against Bohemians who finished in tenth place in the 1998–99 League of Ireland Premier Division. The winner would compete in the 1999–2000 League of Ireland Premier Division.

1st Leg

2nd Leg 

Bohemians won 7–0 on aggregate and retained their place in the Premier Division.

See also
 1998–99 League of Ireland Premier Division

References

League of Ireland First Division seasons
2
Ireland